Cataguases is a municipality located in the southeastern part of the state of Minas Gerais in Brazil. The estimated population in 2020 was 75,540. It is mainly an industrial centre (textile, metallurgy, clothes) with a strong influence of coffee plantation in its early history (19th century).

History 
In the 1920s, the city was associated with the Brazilian cinema pioneer Humberto Mauro and a generation of writers for the short-lived Revista Verde. Humberto Mauro shot there some films that earned him a good reputation nationwide. He later made Braza Dormida (Sleeping Fire) and O Descobrimento do Brasil (The Finding of Brazil) and was a reputed Tupi language scholar.

Industrialisation changed the town significantly and caused some of its citizens to become very rich in the 1920s and 1930s. As a result the city centre was remodeled accordingly to the ultimate architecture styles. The architect Oscar Niemeyer and painters Cândido Portinari, Djanira and Emeric Marcier are some of the Brazilian artists who left contributions there at that time.

After three decades of wealth, the town lost its prominence in the 1970s and 1980s. The economic crisis and the changes due to the modernisation of the industries provoked high unemployment rates and depreciation of salaries, reducing the town's wealth.

In 2003 the town was the site of an ecological accident caused by the spilling of chemical waste that affected the brook Cágado and the rivers Pomba and Paraíba do Sul, threatening the water supply of more than 20,000,000 Brazilians (including the state of Rio de Janeiro).

Climate
Cataguases experiences a tropical savanna climate (Aw under Köppen climate classification). Temperatures are high (above 18 °C (64.4 °F)) all over the year, and low temperatures lasting for a whole day are rare, and generally only occur in the dry season. The wet season starts in September and goes until May, while the dry season goes from May to September. Floods are not uncommon in the town, and generally there is one per year, in December, January or February. On the other side, during the dry season Rio Pomba has considerably less water than in other periods, and some people have respiratory diseases related to low air humidity.

Temperatures

References

Municipalities in Minas Gerais